John Joseph O'Callaghan (1838 – 2 November 1905) was an Irish architect who designed buildings in both England and Ireland.

Life
O'Callaghan was born in County Cork, Ireland. After training in Cork he came to Dublin to join the practice of Thomas Newenham Deane and Benjamin Woodward. In 1856 he was sent as clerk of works to Oxford where he had the opportunity of studying mediaeval architecture. He became an advocate of the Gothic style.

He remained with Deane and Woodford until he set up his own business in Merrion Row in Dublin in 1871. He was elected first president of the Architectural Association of Ireland in 1872.

Select works
 Dolphin House, Essex Street, Dublin
 Tickell Memorial Fountain, Eadestown, County Kildare
 The Glimmer Man pub, Stoneybatter, Dublin
 Lafayette Building, corner of Westmoreland Street and D'Olier Street, Dublin
 The O'Brien Institute, Marino, County Dublin
 St Brigid's Church, Clara, County Offaly
 St Joseph's Church, Mountmellick, County Laois
 St Mary's Church, Haddington Road, Dublin
 St Raphael's College, Loughrea, County Galway
 Synagogue, Adelaide Road, Dublin

References

1838 births
1905 deaths
Irish architects
People from County Cork
Irish ecclesiastical architects